The Ambato River may refer to:

 Ambato River (Ecuador)
 Ambato River (Madagascar)